The 1994 Bavarian state election was held on 25 September 1994 to elect the members of the 13th Landtag of Bavaria. The Christian Social Union (CSU) led by Minister-President Edmund Stoiber retained its majority with minor losses. The largest change in the election was the collapse of the Free Democratic Party (FDP), which lost all its seats.

Parties
The table below lists parties represented in the 12th Landtag of Bavaria.

Opinion polling

Election result

|-
! colspan="2" | Party
! Votes
! %
! +/-
! Seats 
! +/-
! Seats %
|-
| bgcolor=| 
| align=left | Christian Social Union (CSU)
| align=right| 6,163,888
| align=right| 52.8
| align=right| 2.1
| align=right| 120
| align=right| 7
| align=right| 58.8
|-
| bgcolor=| 
| align=left | Social Democratic Party (SPD)
| align=right| 3,506,620
| align=right| 30.0
| align=right| 4.0
| align=right| 70
| align=right| 12
| align=right| 34.3
|-
| bgcolor=| 
| align=left | Alliance 90/The Greens (Grüne)
| align=right| 713,732
| align=right| 6.1
| align=right| 0.3
| align=right| 14
| align=right| 2
| align=right| 6.9
|-
! colspan=8|
|-
| bgcolor=| 
| align=left | The Republicans (REP)
| align=right| 454,170
| align=right| 3.9
| align=right| 1.0
| align=right| 0
| align=right| ±0
| align=right| 0
|-
| bgcolor=| 
| align=left | Free Democratic Party (FDP)
| align=right| 327,305
| align=right| 2.8
| align=right| 2.4
| align=right| 0
| align=right| 7
| align=right| 0
|-
| bgcolor=| 
| align=left | Ecological Democratic Party (ÖDP)
| align=right| 248,983
| align=right| 2.1
| align=right| 0.4
| align=right| 0
| align=right| ±0
| align=right| 0
|-
| bgcolor=#386ABC| 
| align=left | Bavaria Party (BP)
| align=right| 119,872
| align=right| 1.0
| align=right| 0.2
| align=right| 0
| align=right| ±0
| align=right| 0
|-
| 
| align=left | Others
| align=right| 135,311
| align=right| 1.2
| align=right| 
| align=right| 0
| align=right| ±0
| align=right| 0
|-
! align=right colspan=2| Total
! align=right| 11,669,881
! align=right| 100.0
! align=right| 
! align=right| 204
! align=right| ±0
! align=right| 
|-
! align=right colspan=2| Voter turnout
! align=right| 
! align=right| 67.8
! align=right| 1.9
! align=right| 
! align=right| 
! align=right| 
|}

Sources
 Bayerisches Landesamt für Statistik

Bavaria
1994
1994 in Bavaria
September 1994 events in Europe